Diana Elizabeth Ashton (born 26 September 1955) is a British former swimmer. Ashton competed in two events at the 1972 Summer Olympics. At the ASA National British Championships she won the 100 metres backstroke title in 1971 and the 200 metres backstroke title in 1972.

References

External links
 

1955 births
Living people
British female swimmers
Olympic swimmers of Great Britain
Swimmers at the 1972 Summer Olympics
Place of birth missing (living people)
20th-century British women